Pyotr Pavlovich Breus , (December 2, 1927 – February 25, 2000) was a Russian water polo player who competed for the Soviet Union in the 1956 Summer Olympics, part of the team which won the bronze medal. He played in all seven matches and scored two goals.

See also
 List of Olympic medalists in water polo (men)

References
Pyotr Breus' proile at Sport-Strana.ru

External links
 

1927 births
2000 deaths
Russian male water polo players
Soviet male water polo players
Olympic water polo players of the Soviet Union
Water polo players at the 1956 Summer Olympics
Olympic bronze medalists for the Soviet Union
Olympic medalists in water polo
Medalists at the 1956 Summer Olympics